Sainte Genevieve, also known as The Genny, was a steam powered Cutterhead dredge. At the time she was listed on the National Register of Historic Places in 1986 she was located on the Mississippi River along the levee near downtown Davenport, Iowa, United States.

History
The boat was built by the Dravo Contracting Co. of Pittsburgh, Pennsylvania in 1932. She was Hull #1139 and weighed 947 tons.  The Sainte Genevieve had a steel hull and a superstructure of wood with steel for strengthening.  Between 1963 and 1973, 97% of her hull bottom and 71% of her sides were replated.  Her paint scheme of gray and ivory with trim colors of dark red, black and gray was consistentsissippi River to keep it open to barge traffic.  She was the last sternwheel vessel and the last steam-powered dredge operated by the Corps when she retired in 1984. She was given to the city of Davenport for use as a tourist attraction. Plans were to turn her into a dockside restaurant, a floating museum, or a bed and breakfast. Those plans were never realized, and she left Davenport in October 1990 for a new home on the Missouri River in St. Charles, Missouri, where there were plans to turn her into a museum, but that plan never materialized. The Sainte Genevieve sank in 1992 near Cairo, Illinois. She was raised and sank again in Cape Girardeau, Missouri in 1994. She was reportedly scrapped. The vessel was delisted from the National Register of Historic Places in 2019.

References

Dredgers
Ships on the National Register of Historic Places in Iowa
National Register of Historic Places in Davenport, Iowa
Former National Register of Historic Places in Iowa
1932 ships
Ships built by Dravo Corporation